Viktoriya Aleksandrovna Yalovtseva (born 4 November 1977) is a Kazakhstani runner who specializes in the 800 metres.

She has had success on the regional level. She finished fifth at the 2005 Asian Championships, won the bronze medal at the 2005 Asian Indoor Games and the 2006 Asian Indoor Championships, the silver medal at the 2006 Asian Games, finished fourth at the 2007 Asian Indoor Games and won the bronze medal at the 2009 Asian Indoor Games. In the 4 x 400 metres relay event she won a silver medal at the 2008 Asian Indoor Championships and a gold medal at the 2009 Asian Indoor Games. She competed at the 2010 World Indoor Championships.

Her outdoor personal best in the event is 2:00.57 achieved in June 2011 in Bishkek, while her personal best indoor time is 2:03.74 minutes, achieved in November 2009 in Hanoi.

Competition record

References

1977 births
Living people
Kazakhstani female middle-distance runners
Asian Games medalists in athletics (track and field)
Athletes (track and field) at the 2006 Asian Games
Athletes (track and field) at the 2010 Asian Games
Asian Games silver medalists for Kazakhstan
Medalists at the 2006 Asian Games
Medalists at the 2010 Asian Games
Competitors at the 2005 Summer Universiade
21st-century Kazakhstani women